Lewis Marshall (born 29 August 1988) is a New Zealand rugby union player who currently plays for  in the Mitre 10 Cup. His preferred position is fullback, though he is a versatile backline player.

Although from Wainuiomata, Marshall attended Hato Paora College, in Feilding.

Marshall did not start playing rugby union until his first year of Secondary education. He initially played rugby league.

He started his provincial career with Manawatu, making his debut in 2010.

In 2015, Marshall was forced to move away from the Manawatu to Hawke's Bay after his partner received a teaching job. Marshall himself then got a job as a teacher aide.

Family 
Marshall and his partner, Tammy, have a 19-month old son.

References 

New Zealand rugby union players
1988 births
Manawatu rugby union players
Hawke's Bay rugby union players
Living people
Rugby union players from Lower Hutt
People educated at Hato Paora College